Harrington (or Harington) may refer to:

People as a surname
Harrington (surname)

People as a forename
Arthur Raikes (Arthur Edward Harington Raikes, 1867–1915), British army officer
Charles Harrington Elster, American writer
Edward Joseph Harrington O'Brien (1890–1941), American author
Francis Harrington Glidden (1832–1922), American businessman
Bantu Holomisa (Bantubonke Harrington Holomisa, born 1955), leader of the United Democratic Movement in South Africa
Harrington Lees (1870–1929), Australian archbishop
Harrington Darnell Autry (born 1976), American football player
Harrington Evans Broad (1844–1927), English politician
Harrington Hext, pseudonym of English author Eden Phillpots
Hulbert Harrington Warner (1842–1923), American businessman
Ivo Whitton (Ivo Harrington Whitton, 1893–1967), Australian golfer
John Harington Gubbins (1852–1929), British linguist
John Harrington Stevens, American senator
Jonathan H. Green (Jonathan Harrington Green, 1813–1887), American gambler and inventor
Louis Harrington Lewry, Canadian politician
Paul Hewitt (Paul Harrington Hewitt, born 1963), American basketball coach
Virginia Knauer (Virginia Harrington Knauer, 1915–2011), American politician

Places

Australia
Harrington, New South Wales
Harrington Park, New South Wales

Bermuda
Harrington Sound

Canada
Harrington, Ontario
Harrington, Quebec
Harrington Harbour, Quebec
Harrington Lake

New Zealand
Harington Point

United Kingdom
Harrington, Cumbria
Harrington, Lincolnshire
Harrington, Northamptonshire
Harrington Bridge, crosses the River Trent between Derbyshire and Leicestershire
Harrington Dock, Liverpool
Harrington Road tram stop, South Norwood, London
RAF Harrington, Northamptonshire

United States
Harrington, California
Harrington, Delaware
Harrington, Maine
Harrington (Princess Anne, Maryland), listed on the NRHP in Maryland
Harrington, South Dakota
Harrington, Virginia
Harrington, Washington
Harrington Bay, Maine
Harrington Beach State Park, Wisconsin
Harrington Creek, California
Harrington House (Weston, Massachusetts)
Lake Harrington, a lake in Minnesota
Harrington Meeting House, Maine
Harrington Park, New Jersey
Camp Don Harrington, Texas
Don Harrington Discovery Center, Amarillo, Texas

Characters
Allison Chou Harrington, fictional character in David Weber's Honorverse
Brandy Harrington, animated dog
Catherine Harrington, fictional character in TV drama Peyton Place
Derby Harrington, fictional character from the video game Bully
Eve Harrington, lead character in the film All about Eve
Faith Harrington, character in Lost TV series
Honor Harrington,  fictional character in David Weber's Honorverse
Leslie Harrington, fictional character in TV drama Peyton Place
Rodney Harrington, fictional character in TV drama Peyton Place
Stephanie Harrington, fictional superhero
Steve Harrington, fictional character from the Netflix series Stranger Things

Other
Evan Harrington, a novel by George Meredith
Harrington (novel), an 1817 novel by Maria Edgeworth
Harrington–Hollingsworth experiment, in hematology
Harrington & Richardson, an American brand of firearms
Harington baronets, an English title
Harrington College of Design, Chicago
Harrington College Icebergs, a Canadian ice hockey team
Harrington (typeface), a typeface included with Microsoft Windows
Harrington rod
Harrington jacket
Harrington Park Press
Harrington's gerbil
Harrington's rat
Harrington-Wilson 1, a galaxy
SS D. W. Harrington, a U.S. WWII Cargo ship
Thomas Harrington & Sons, a British coachbuilding business
Harrington Legionnaire, a coach body built by Thomas Harrington Ltd
52P/Harrington–Abell, a comet
3216 Harrington, an asteroid